Robin Press (born 21 December 1994) is a Swedish ice hockey defenceman. He is currently playing with Severstal Cherepovets in the Kontinental Hockey League (KHL). He was selected by the Chicago Blackhawks in the 7th round (211th overall and last player taken) of the 2013 NHL Entry Draft.

Playing career
Press previously played for Almtuna IS and Södertälje SK in the Swedish second tier HockeyAllsvenskan before making his Swedish Hockey League debut with Djurgårdens IF.

After playing two seasons in North America, within the Chicago Blackhawks affiliate's the Rockford IceHogs and Indy Fuel, Press returned to Sweden in agreeing to a one-year contract with Färjestad BK on May 24, 2018. In the 2018–19 season, Press contributed 2 goals and 10 points through 40 games, eclipsing his previous markers.

On 2 May 2019, Press opted to continue his career in Finland, agreeing to an optional two-year contract with Lukko of the Liiga. During his tenure with Lukko, Press developed his offensive game and established himself  as the club's top defenceman. In the 2020–21 season, Press lead the Lukko blueline and also led the Liiga in scoring in points among defenseman with 17 goals and 48 points in 58 regular season games. He was recognized as the league's best defenseman and player of the regular season after he was awarded with the Pekka Rautakallio trophy and the Lasse Oksanen trophy. He contributed with 8 post-season points through 11 games to help Lukko capture their first Kanada-malja trophy.

As a free agent, Press opted to test himself in the KHL, joining Severstal Cherepovets on a one-year contract on 1 May 2021. He extended his contract the following year, which caused controversy as he was the first Swedish ice hockey player to sign a contract with KHL after the 2022 Russian invasion of Ukraine.

Career statistics

Awards and honours

References

External links

1994 births
Living people
Almtuna IS players
Chicago Blackhawks draft picks
Djurgårdens IF Hockey players
Färjestad BK players
Indy Fuel players
Lukko players
Rockford IceHogs (AHL) players
Severstal Cherepovets players
Södertälje SK players
Ice hockey people from Stockholm
Swedish ice hockey defencemen